Wranga Loni (also spelled Wrranga Lunri or Wrranga Luni) is a human rights activist and writer from Sanjawi in northern Balochistan, Pakistan. She is a leading member of the Pashtun Tahafuz Movement (PTM), as well as a founding member of the Waak Movement, which aims to bring political awareness among Pashtun women.

Social activism
Wranga joined the Pashtun Tahafuz Movement in February 2018 along with her elder brother, Arman Loni. Both of them actively took part in organizing the PTM public gatherings, usually traveling to the gathering site a week earlier to help run awareness campaigns among the locals. Wranga recalled, “[Arman] said women’s awareness was important for our future survival in peace and with human dignity.” At the gatherings, Wranga would mostly give speeches from the stage but Arman would usually prefer to be behind the scenes. The activities of Arman and Wranga irked the local tribal chiefs, because of which Arman's family was forced to move from their native Sanjawi to Killa Saifullah, the hometown of Nawab Ayaz Jogezai, the Pashtun tribal chief who offered them refuge. On 2 February 2019, after Wranga and Arman participated at a protest sit-in outside Loralai Press Club in Loralai, her brother was allegedly killed during a crackdown by the police. The police, however, refused to lodge an FIR, which was criticized by Shireen Mazari, the Human Rights Minister of Pakistan.

On 9 February 2020, just before PTM's public gathering in Loralai to mark the first death anniversary of Arman Loni, security forces arrested Wranga Loni, Arfa Siddiq, Sanna Ejaz, and other female PTM activists as they were on their way to the gathering site. The security forces released them, however, when political activists gathered outside the police station to protest for them.

See also
 Gulalai Ismail
 Bushra Gohar

References

External links
"Pakistan: My brother was killed for fighting for our rights", article by Wranga Loni, Amnesty International, 18 April 2019.

Living people
Pakistani human rights activists
Pakistani humanists
Pashtun women
Pakistani feminists
Feminism in Pakistan
Women's rights in Pakistan
People from Ziarat District
Pashtun Tahafuz Movement politicians
Pakistani prisoners and detainees
Pashto-language poets
Year of birth missing (living people)